The KPMG Trophy is a golf tournament on the Challenge Tour, played in Belgium. It was first played in May 2006 as the Telenet Trophy at Limburg G&CC in Houthalen-Helchteren, and has rotated through several other venues throughout its history.

Winners

References

External links
Coverage on the Challenge Tour's official site

Former Challenge Tour events
Golf tournaments in Belgium
Recurring sporting events established in 2006
Sport in Antwerp Province
Aartselaar